A wall is a structure and a surface that defines an area; carries a load; provides security, shelter, or soundproofing; or, is decorative. There are many kinds of walls, including:
 Walls in buildings that form a fundamental part of the superstructure or separate interior rooms, sometimes for fire safety
Glass walls (a wall in which the primary structure is made of glass; does not include openings within walls that have glass coverings: these are windows)
 Border barriers between countries
 Brick walls
 Defensive walls in fortifications
 Permanent, solid fences
 Retaining walls, which hold back dirt, stone, water, or noise sound
 Stone walls
 Walls that protect from oceans (seawalls) or rivers (levees)

Etymology

The term wall comes from Latin vallum meaning "...an earthen wall or rampart set with palisades, a row or line of stakes, a wall, a rampart, fortification..." while the Latin word murus means a defensive stone wall. 
English uses the same word to mean an external wall and the internal sides of a room, but this is not universal. Many languages distinguish between the two. In German, some of this distinction can be seen between Wand and Mauer, in Spanish between pared and muro.

Defensive wall

The word wall originally referred to defensive walls and ramparts.

Building wall

The purposes of walls in buildings are to support roofs, floors and ceilings; to enclose a space as part of the building envelope along with a roof to give buildings form; and to provide shelter and security. In addition, the wall may house various types of utilities such as electrical wiring or plumbing. Wall construction falls into two basic categories: framed walls or mass-walls. In framed walls the load is transferred to the foundation through posts, columns or studs. Framed walls most often have three or more separate components: the structural elements (such as 2×4 studs in a house wall), insulation, and finish elements or surfaces (such as drywall or panelling). Mass-walls are of a solid material including masonry, concrete including slipform stonemasonry, log building, cordwood construction, adobe, rammed earth, cob, earthbag construction, bottles, tin cans, straw-bale construction, and ice. Walls may or may not be leadbearing. Walls are required to conform to the local building and/or fire codes.

There are three basic methods walls control water intrusion: moisture storage, drained cladding, or face-sealed cladding. Moisture storage is typical of stone and brick mass-wall buildings where moisture is absorbed and released by the walls of the structure itself. Drained cladding also known as screened walls acknowledges moisture will penetrate the cladding so a moisture barrier such as housewrap or felt paper inside the cladding provides a second line of defense and sometimes a drainage plane or air gap allows a path for the moisture to drain down through and exit the wall. Sometimes ventilation is provided in addition to the drainage plane such as in rainscreen construction. Face-sealed also called barrier wall or perfect barrier cladding relies on maintaining a leak-free surface of the cladding. Examples of face sealed cladding are the early exterior insulation finishing systems, structural glazing, metal clad panels, and corrugated metal.

Building walls frequently become works of art, externally and internally, such as when featuring mosaic work or when murals are painted on them; or as design foci when they exhibit textures or painted finishes for effect.

Curtain wall

In architecture and civil engineering, curtain wall refers to a building facade that is not load-bearing but provides decoration, finish, front, face, or historical preservation.

Precast wall
Precast walls are walls which have been manufactured in a factory and then shipped to where it is needed, ready to install. It is faster to install compared to brick and other walls and may have a lower cost compared to other types of wall. Precast walls are cost effective compare to Brick Wall compound wall.

Mullion wall

Mullion walls are a structural system that carries the load of the floor slab on prefabricated panels around the perimeter.

Partition wall

A partition wall is a usually thin wall that is used to separate or divide a room, primarily a pre-existing one. Partition walls are usually not load-bearing, and can be constructed out of many materials, including steel panels, bricks, cloth, plastic, plasterboard, wood, blocks of clay, terracotta, concrete, and glass.

Some partition walls are made of sheet glass. Glass partition walls are a series of individual toughened glass panels mounted in wood or metal framing. They may be suspended from or slide along a robust aluminium ceiling track. The system does not require the use of a floor guide, which allows easy operation and an uninterrupted threshold.

A timber partition consists of a wooden framework, supported on the floor or by side walls. Metal lath and plaster, properly laid, forms a reinforced partition wall. Partition walls constructed from fibre cement backer board are popular as bases for tiling in kitchens or in wet areas like bathrooms. Galvanized sheet fixed to wooden or steel members are mostly adopted in works of temporary character. Plain or reinforced partition walls may also be constructed from concrete, including pre-cast concrete blocks. Metal framed partitioning is also available. This partition consists of track (used primarily at the base and head of the partition) and studs (vertical sections fixed into the track typically spaced at 24", 16", or at 12").

Internal wall partitions, also known as office partitioning, are usually made of plasterboard (drywall) or varieties of glass. Toughened glass is a common option, as low-iron glass (better known as opti-white glass) increases light and solar heat transmission.

Wall partitions are constructed using beads and tracking that is either hung from the ceiling or fixed into the ground. The panels are inserted into the tracking and fixed. Some wall partition variations specify their fire resistance and acoustic performance rating.

Movable partitions

Movable partitions are walls that open to join two or more rooms into one large floor area. These include:
 Sliding—a series of panels that slide in tracks fixed to the floor and ceiling, similar sliding doors
 Sliding and folding doors —similar to sliding folding doors, these are good for smaller spans
 Folding partition walls - a series of interlocking panels suspended from an overhead track that when extended provide an acoustical separation, and when retracted stack against a wall, ceiling, closet, or ceiling pocket.
 Screens—usually constructed of a metal or timber frame fixed with plywood and chipboard and supported with legs for free standing and easy movement
 Pipe and drape—fixed or telescopic uprights and horizontals provide a ground supported drape system with removable panels.

Party wall

Party walls are walls that separate buildings or units within a building. They provide fire resistance and sound resistance between occupants in a building. The minimum fire resistance and sound resistance required for the party wall is determined by a building code and may be modified to suit a variety of situations. Ownership of such walls can become a legal issue. It is not a load-bearing wall and may be owned by different people.

Infill wall

An infill wall is the supported wall that closes the perimeter of a building constructed with a three-dimensional framework structure.

Fire wall

Fire walls resist spread of fire within or sometimes between structures to provide passive fire protection. A delay in the spread of fire gives occupants more time to escape and fire fighters more time to extinguish the fire. Some fire walls allow fire resistive window assemblies, and are made of non-combustible material such as concrete, cement block, brick, or fire rated drywall. Wall penetrations are sealed with fire resistive materials. A doorway in a firewall must have a rated fire door. Fire walls provide varying resistance to the spread of fire, (e.g., one, two, three or four hours). Firewalls can also act as smoke barriers when constructed vertically from slab to roof deck and horizontally from an exterior wall to exterior wall subdividing a building into sections.

Shear wall

Shear walls resist lateral forces such as in an earthquake or severe wind. There are different kinds of shear walls such as the steel plate shear wall.

Knee wall

Knee walls are short walls that either support rafters or add height in the top floor rooms of houses. In a -story house, the knee wall supports the half story.

Cavity wall

Cavity walls are walls made with a space between two "skins" to inhibit heat transfer.

Pony wall
Pony wall (or dwarf wall) is a general term for short walls, such as:
 A half wall that only extends partway from floor to ceiling, without supporting anything
 A stem wall—a concrete wall that extends from the foundation slab to the cripple wall or floor joists
 A cripple wall—a framed wall from the stem wall or foundation slab to the floor joists

Demountable wall

Demountable walls fall into 3 different main types:
Glass walls (unitesed panels or butt joint),
Laminated particle board walls (this may also include other finishes, such as whiteboards, cork board, magnetic, etc., typically all on purpose-made wall studs)
Drywall

Solar energy

A trombe wall in passive solar building design acts as a heat sink.

Shipbuilding

On a ship, a wall that separates major compartments is called a bulkhead. A thinner wall between cabins is called a partition.

Boundary wall

Boundary walls include privacy walls, boundary-marking walls on property, and town walls. These intergrade into fences. The conventional differentiation is that a fence is of minimal thickness and often open in nature, while a wall is usually more than a nominal thickness and is completely closed, or opaque. More to the point, an exterior structure of wood or wire is generally called a fence—but one of masonry is a wall. A common term for both is barrier, which is convenient for structures that are partly wall and partly fence—for example the Berlin Wall. Another kind of wall-fence ambiguity is the ha-ha—which is set below ground level to protect a view, yet acts as a barrier (to cattle, for example).

Before the invention of artillery, many of the world's cities and towns, particularly in Europe and Asia, had defensive or protective walls (also called town walls or city walls). In fact, the English word "wall" derives from Latin vallum—a type of fortification wall. These walls are no longer relevant for defense, so such cities have grown beyond their walls, and many fortification walls, or portions of them, have been torn down—for example in Rome, Italy and Beijing, China. Examples of protective walls on a much larger scale include the Great Wall of China and Hadrian's Wall.

Border wall

Some walls formally mark the border between one population and another. A border wall is constructed to limit the movement of people across a certain line or border. These structures vary in placement with regard to international borders and topography. The most famous example of border barrier in history is probably the Great Wall of China, a series of walls that separated the Empire of China from nomadic powers to the north. The most prominent recent example is the Berlin Wall, which surrounded the enclave of West Berlin and separated it from East Germany for most of the Cold War era. The US-Mexico border wall, separating the United States and Mexico, is another recent example.

Retaining wall

In areas of rocky soils around the world, farmers have often pulled large quantities of stone out of their fields to make farming easier and have stacked those stones to make walls that either mark the field boundary, or the property boundary, or both.

Retaining walls resist movement of earth, stone, or water. They may be part of a building or external. The ground surface or water on one side of a retaining wall is typically higher than on the other side. A dike is a retaining wall, as is a levee, a load-bearing foundation wall, and a sea wall.

Shared wall
Special laws often govern walls that neighbouring properties share. Typically, one neighbour cannot alter the common wall if it is likely to affect the building or property on the other side. A wall may also separate apartment or hotel rooms from each other. Each wall has two sides and breaking a wall on one side will break the wall on the other side.

Portable wall
Portable walls, such as room dividers or portable partitions divide a larger open space into smaller rooms. Portable walls can be static, such as cubicle walls, or can be wall panels mounted on casters to provide an easy way to reconfigure assembly space. They are often found inside schools, churches, convention centers, hotels, and corporate facilities.

Temporary wall
A temporary wall is constructed for easy removal or demolition. A typical temporary wall can be constructed with 1⁄2" (6 mm) to 5⁄8" (16 mm) sheet rock (plasterboard), metal 2 × 3s (approx. 5 × 7 cm), or 2 × 4s, or taped, plastered and compounded. Most installation companies use lattice (strips of wood) to cover the joints of the temporary wall with the ceiling. These are sometimes known as pressurized walls or temporary pressurized walls.

Walls in popular culture
Walls are often seen in popular culture, oftentimes representing barriers preventing progress or entry. For example:

Fictional and symbolic walls

The progressive/psychedelic rock band Pink Floyd used a metaphorical wall to represent the isolation felt by the protagonist of their 1979 concept album The Wall.

The American poet laureate Robert Frost describes a pointless rock wall as a metaphor for the myopia of the culture-bound in his poem "Mending Wall", published in 1914.

Walls are a recurring symbol in Ursula K. Le Guin's 1974 novel The Dispossessed'.

In some cases, a wall may refer to an individual's debilitating mental or physical condition, seen as an impassable barrier.

In George R. R. Martin's A Song of Ice and Fire series and its television adaptation, Game of Thrones'', The Wall plays multiple important roles: as a colossal fortification, made of ice and fortified with magic spells; as a cultural barrier; and as a codification of assumptions. Breaches of the wall, who is allowed to cross it and who is not, and its destruction have important symbolic, logistical, and socio-political implications in the storyline. Reportedly over 700 feet high and 100 leagues (300 miles) wide, it divides the northern border of the Seven Kingdoms realm from the domain of the wildlings and several categories of undead who live beyond it.

Historical walls
In a real-life example, the Berlin Wall, constructed by the Soviet Union to divide Berlin into NATO and Warsaw Pact zones of occupation, became a worldwide symbol of oppression and isolation.

Social media walls
Another common usage is as a communal surface to write upon. For instance the social networking site Facebook previously used an electronic "wall" to log the scrawls of friends until it was replaced by the "timeline" feature.

See also

 Ashlar
 Chemise (wall)
 Clay panel
 Climbing wall
 Fabric structure
 Hy-Rib
 List of walls
 Sleeper wall
 Stone wall
 Tensile structure
 Terraced wall
 Thin-shell structure
 Wallpaper

References

External links

 
Archaeological features
Home
Property law
Structural system